McHattie is a surname. Notable people with the surname include:

Kevin McHattie (born 1993), Scottish footballer
Stephen McHattie (born 1947), Canadian actor